Palazzo Pisani Moretta is a palace situated along the Grand Canal in Venice, Italy (in the sestiere of San Polo), between Palazzo Tiepolo and Palazzo Barbarigo della Terrazza.

History
Built in the second half of the 15th century by the Bembo family, the palace soon became the residence of a branch of the noble Pisani family (the Pisani Moretta branch). The palace was renovated, modified and extended over the following centuries, finally taking on its current aspect in the 18th century. In fact many of the valuable interior decorations date back to the 18th century. Past guests to the palace included important historic figures such as Tsar Paul I of Russia, Joséphine de Beauharnais and Joseph II, Holy Roman Emperor.

Palazzo Pisani Moretta remained in the Pisani family until it died out in 1880 but the building is still owned privately.

The interior rooms were decorated by Baroque artists such as Tiepolo, Jacopo Guarana, Gaspare Diziani and Giuseppe Angeli. The palace once housed, among other things, Paolo Veronese's monumental painting The Family of Darius before Alexander, which was viewed here by Goethe in 1786 (diary entry from October 8 of that year) and acquired by the National Gallery, London, in 1857, where it now hangs. The palace is said to have housed a ceiling painting called The Chariots of Aurora by Giovanni Antonio Pellegrini (1675–1741), which was restored and installed in the Library of George Vanderbilt's Biltmore House in Asheville, North Carolina, in the United States.

It hosts an annual masquerade ball Il Ballo del Doge, held during the Carnival period.

Description

The façade of Palazzo Pisani Moretta is an example of Venetian Gothic floral style with its two floors of six-light mullioned windows with ogival arches, similar to those found in the loggia of the Doge's Palace flanked by two single windows. The ground floor has two central pointed arched doorways opening on to the canal.

External links
Palazzo Pisani Moretta, official website

Pisani Moretta
Pisani Moretta
Gothic architecture in Venice
Pisani family